The Estonian Iraqi Contingent or (simply Iraqi Contingent) was a joint military force of the Estonian Defence Forces deployed mainly in the Baghdad Governorate in Sab-al-Bori area.

History 
This the order of battle of the known units that operated within the Estonian Iraqi Contingent between 2003 and 2008:
 ESTPLA-18 infantry platoon: cancelled
 ESTPLA-17 infantry platoon: 
 ESTPLA-16 infantry platoon: 
 ESTPLA-15 infantry platoon: 
 ESTPLA-14 infantry platoon: 
 ESTPLA-13 infantry platoon: 
 ESTPLA-12 infantry platoon: 
 ESTPLA-11 infantry platoon:
 ESTPLA-10 infantry platoon: 
 ESTPLA-9 infantry platoon: 
 ESTPLA-8 infantry platoon: 
 ESTPLA-7 infantry platoon: 
 ESTPLA-6 infantry platoon: 
 ESTPLA-5 infantry platoon: 
 ESTPLA-4 infantry platoon: 
 ESTPLA-3 infantry platoon:
 ESTPLA-2 infantry platoon: 
 ESTPLA-1 infantry platoon:

See also 
MNFI - Multinational force in Iraq
Estonian Afghanistan Contingent
List of Estonian Contingencies

References 

Military units and formations of Estonia
Military units and formations established in 2003
Military units and formations disestablished in 2008